Nickels for Your Nightmares is the fourth album by the Canadian rock band Headstones. The album featured the hit singles "Settle" and "Blonde & Blue", which reached #4 and #8 on Canada's Rock chart, respectively. By June 2000, the album had sold 30,000 copies.

Track listing

Chart performance

References

2000 albums
Headstones (band) albums
MCA Records albums